Walter Ferrier Hamilton (31 May 1818 – 8 April 1872, Torphichen) was a British Liberal politician.

Ferrier Hamilton was elected Liberal MP for Linlithgowshire at the 1859 general election until 1865 when he did not seek re-election at that year's election.

References

External links
 

Scottish Liberal Party MPs
UK MPs 1859–1865
1818 births
1872 deaths